Nicolás Baptiste Velasco (born 31 October 2005) is a Colombian racing driver who is set to compete in the 2023 Formula Regional European Championship with Saintéloc Racing, having previously drove for FA Racing.

Career

Karting 
Baptiste debuted in karting at the age of nine and started karting competitively two years later in 2016. His highest ranking in a karting competition would be eighth in the Colombia Rotax Max Challenge. He took part in the European Championship in 2020, ending up 60th in the standings.

Formula 4

2020 
Baptiste made his single-seater debut during the penultimate round of the 2020 F4 Spanish Championship, a week after his 15th birthday. He took part in one weekend, the Jarama round, and finished 14th and two twelfth places in the races.

Two weeks later, Baptiste made his debut in the 2020 Italian F4 Championship with Cram Motorsport for the final two rounds. He took a best finish of 15th and finished 27th in the championship.

2021 

Baptiste contested the full 2021 Italian F4 Championship as his main campaign, again with Cram Motorsport. He scored his first points in eighth place during the second Misano race, and he was also the second best rookie. His next points finish came at the last race in the Red Bull Ring scoring a fifth place and placing the best of the rookies. Baptiste would not go on to score any more points and he finished 24th in the championship with 14 points, and ninth in the rookies'.

Formula Regional European Championship

2022 
Baptiste stepped up to the 2022 Formula Regional European Championship. He joined two-time Formula One World Champion Fernando Alonso's team, FA Racing, alongside Victor Bernier and Esteban Masson. During his debut weekend in Monza, he finished 16th and 29th. Baptiste ended very strongly during the final weekend in Mugello, he qualified a season high of seventh during the first race, although he would drop to 15th which was his season best result. The Colombian would finish 29th in the standings, the only one in his team not to score points during the season.

2023 
Baptiste remained in Formula Regional for 2023, switching over to Saintéloc Racing.

Karting record

Karting career summary

Racing record

Racing career summary 

† As Baptiste was a guest driver, he was ineligible to score points.* Season still in progress.

Complete F4 Spanish Championship results 
(key) (Races in bold indicate pole position) (Races in italics indicate fastest lap)

† As Baptiste was a guest driver, he was ineligible to score points.

Complete Italian F4 Championship results 
(key) (Races in bold indicate pole position) (Races in italics indicate fastest lap)

Complete Formula Regional European Championship results 
(key) (Races in bold indicate pole position) (Races in italics indicate fastest lap)

* Season still in progress.

References

External links 
 
 

Colombian racing drivers
Spanish F4 Championship drivers
Italian F4 Championship drivers
Formula Regional European Championship drivers
Living people
2005 births
Sportspeople from Bogotá
Cram Competition drivers
Drivex drivers
FA Racing drivers
MP Motorsport drivers
Karting World Championship drivers
21st-century Colombian people
Saintéloc Racing drivers